Cameron Hepburn is an Australian Professor of Environmental Economics at the University of Oxford and the London School of Economics and Political Science, both in the United Kingdom. He is Director of the Economics of Sustainability Programme at the Institute for New Economic Thinking at the Oxford Martin School.

Education 
Hepburn attended Camberwell Grammar School and received his undergraduate education at the University of Melbourne in Australia and his master's degree and doctorate from the University of Oxford.

Career 
Hepburn was an advisor to the former role of UK Secretary of State for Energy and Climate Change. He used to be part of the Academic Panel within the UK Department for Environment, Food and Rural Affairs and the UK Department of Energy and Climate Change. Hepburn advised the UN and the OECD on environmental policy, energy and resources. He has also worked at Shell, Mallesons, and McKinsey & Company.

Research 
Hepburn is a research fellow at the Grantham Research Institute on Climate Change and the Environment at the London School of Economics and Political Science and his research interests are "Environmental economics; Climate change economics; Environmental policy; Carbon markets and emissions trading; Sustainability; Behavioural economics." Hepburn has "over 30 peer-reviewed publications in a range of disciplines."

Selected publications
 Hepburn, Cameron J. and Hamilton, Kirk. eds. (2017) "National Wealth: What is Missing, Why it Matters", Oxford, UK: Oxford University Press. 
 Hepburn, Cameron J. and Albert, Jose R. G. and Thomas, Vinod. (2014). "Contributors to the frequency of intense climate disasters in Asia-Pacific countries", Climate Change, 126 (3-4). 381-398. Print  Online 
 Hepburn, Cameron J. and Farmer, Doyne. (2014). "Less Precision, more truth: Uncertainty in climate economics and macroprudential policy", Bank of England 2 April 2014 - Programme.
 Hepburn, Cameron J. and Hamilton, Kirk. (2014). "Wealth", Oxford Review of Economic Policy, 30 (1). 1-20. doi: 10.1093/oxrep/gru010
 Hepburn, Cameron J. and Dieter Helm, eds. (2014). Nature in the Balance: The Economics of Biodiversity, Oxford, UK: Oxford University Press.  
 Hepburn, Cameron J. and Baptist, Simon. (2013). "Intermediate inputs and economic productivity" Philosophical Transactions of the Royal Society A. doi: 10.1098/rsta.2011.0565
 Hepburn, Cameron J. and Quah, John K. H. and Ritz, Robert A. (2013). Emissions trading with profit-neutral permit allocations, Journal of Public Economics, 98. 85-99. 
 Hepburn, Cameron J. (2012). The energy mix, carbon pricing and border carbon adjustments Environmental Law and Management, 24 (4). 177-185. 
 Hepburn, Cameron J. and Dieter Helm, eds. (2011). "The Economics and Politics of Climate Change", Oxford, UK: Oxford University Press.  
 Hepburn, Cameron J. (2010). Environmental policy, government, and the market - special issue, edited by Cameron Hepburn Oxford Review of Economic Policy, 26 (2). 117-284.

References

External links
 Personal website
 Oxford Martin School profile

21st-century Australian economists
Australian academics
Australian Rhodes Scholars
University of Melbourne alumni
Alumni of Magdalen College, Oxford
Environmental economists
Fellows of New College, Oxford
Living people
People associated with renewable energy
Year of birth missing (living people)